Hile is a village development committee in Baglung District in the Dhaulagiri Zone of central Nepal. At the time of the 1991 Nepal census it had a population of 2,891 and had 530 houses in the village. The town was founded in 1978.

References

Populated places in Baglung District